Manakkal Rangarajan (13 September 1922 - 26 February 2019)  was a Carnatic music singer who hailed from the village of Manakkal in Trichy District. His father was the late Santhana Krishna Bhagavathar. He had been singing for more than six decades and was performing even past his 80th year. He died on 26/2/2019 due to old age of 96.

Performing Style 
He was a specialist in brigas, rare ragas and pallavis. He had performed all over India and abroad and had been accompanied by vidwans like Mysore T. Chowdiah, Kumbakonam Rajamanickam Pillai, Palghat Mani Iyer, Nagercoil Ganesa iyer and Palani Subramaniam Pillai.
 
Rangarajan had performed at Saint Tyagaraja music festival at Thiruvaiyaru for the past sixty years without a gap. He is the only musician who has sung in AIR Chennai since its inception without repeating a single song. Rangarajan had the distinction of giving rare pallavi demonstrations at the Madras Music Academy using both hands for Thalam, comprising different Nadais.

Titles & Awards
 Kalaimamani - Tamil Nadu State award.
 Gayaka Samrat conferred by Indian Fine Arts Society Annual Conference in 1957
 Sangita Simham conferred by Sangita Kalanidhi Chembai Vaidyanatha Bhagavathar.
 Ugadi Puraskar award by the Madras Telugu Academy.
 Award from Maharajapuram Viswanatha Iyer Trust in the year 1999.
 Sangita Kalashikhamani, 2010, Awarded by The Fine Arts Society, Chennai
 Ganakala Ratna
 Ganakala Sagara

References

1920s births
2019 deaths
Male Carnatic singers
Carnatic singers
Year of birth missing